The Chelsea Branch Railroad was a railroad company in the U.S. state of New Jersey.  In May 1896, it was merged with several other railroads to form the West Jersey and Seashore Railroad, part of the Pennsylvania Railroad system in Atlantic City, New Jersey.

History 
The Chelsea Branch Railroad was chartered to build a line from Maine Avenue in Atlantic City to Chelsea. The company's stock was subscribed in 1889.

Representatives of the Chelsea Branch Railroad met with those of the West Jersey Railroad, the Alloway and Quinton Railroad, the Camden and Atlantic Railroad, and the Philadelphia, Marlton and Medford Railroad on May 2, 1896, to finalize the vote to merge as the West Jersey and Seashore Railroad.  The merger became effective on May 4, 1896.

References 

Predecessors of the Pennsylvania-Reading Seashore Lines
Defunct New Jersey railroads
Railway companies established in 1889
Railway companies disestablished in 1896
1889 establishments in New Jersey